KGBZ-LP (102.5 FM, "Ondas de Vida") is a low-power radio station broadcasting a religious format. Licensed to Madras, Oregon, United States, the station is currently owned by Central Oregon Educational Radio Corporation. The station's programming originates at KODV in Barstow, California.

References

External links
 
 

GBZ-LP
GBZ-LP
Madras, Oregon
Radio stations established in 2003
2003 establishments in Oregon
GBZ-LP